Yago Moreira Silva or simply Yago (born 28 April 1994) is a Brazilian footballer who plays as a winger.

References

External links
 

1994 births
Living people
Brazilian footballers
Brazilian expatriate footballers
Association football wingers
Campeonato Brasileiro Série A players
CR Vasco da Gama players
Minnesota United FC (2010–2016) players
North American Soccer Football League players
North American Soccer League players
Expatriate soccer players in the United States
Expatriate footballers in South Korea
Brazilian expatriate sportspeople in South Korea
Seoul E-Land FC players
K League 2 players
Brazil youth international footballers